The Night Walker is a 1964 American psychological horror film directed and produced by William Castle, written by Robert Bloch, and starring Robert Taylor, Judith Meredith, Lloyd Bochner and Barbara Stanwyck in her final film role. It follows the wife of a wealthy inventor who is plagued by increasingly disturbing nightmares, which escalate after her husband's death. It was the final black and white film made by Universal Pictures.

Plot
Irene Trent is unhappily married to a blind, pathologically possessive millionaire inventor, Howard. Howard and Irene's palatial mansion is packed with an endless assortment of cuckoo clocks, all in perfect synchronization, and Howard tape records all conversations in the house for later reference, hoping to catch Irene plotting an illicit liaison. Irene lives in a constant state of dread due to Howard's jealousy. Yet despite Howard's continual accusations of infidelity, Irene remains faithful to Howard, albeit with nightly recurrent dreams of a fantasy lover and an attraction to Howard's attorney, Barry Morland.

Howard spends most of his time working in his upstairs laboratory on a variety of projects, the nature of which he refuses to divulge to anyone. As tensions mount, Irene feels trapped in a loveless, lonely relationship. But suddenly, everything changes: Howard is killed by an explosion in the laboratory, and Irene is set to inherit the house along with Howard's entire fortune. However, Barry informs Irene that the estate must first go through a lengthy probate process.

The laboratory itself, a charred wreck, is secured from the rest of the house by a padlock so that no one may enter it. Irene subsequently has a nightmare in which a disfigured Howard stalks her through the house. The event frightens Irene enough that she decides to move out of the house, and return to the back-room apartment of the beauty shop she owns, which she operated prior to marrying Howard. There, she finds a confidant in Joyce, a newly hired beautician. Almost immediately, Irene's dreams begin again, with increasing intensity, until they take the form of an "ideal" man—known only as "The Dream".

Night after night, "The Dream" appears before Irene, whisking her away, initially to two different apartment locales, where they engage in harmless trysts over champagne. During one instance, however, Irene is escorted to a bizarre wedding ceremony, in which she "marries" "The Dream" in front of a group of wax figure witnesses. Irene recognizes the chapel as the same one in which she and Howard were married. Questioning her sanity, Irene visits the now-abandoned chapel with Barry. A groundskeeper allows them inside, and Irene is shocked to find the wedding ring from her dream lying on the floor. As Irene and Barry depart the chapel, "The Dream" emerges from the shadows, watching them as they exit. Barry subsequently informs Irene that, prior to Howard's death, Howard had enlisted a private detective named George Fuller to stalk her. Later, while visiting the empty Trent home alone, Barry finds several wax mannequins hidden in the laboratory.

When Irene returns to the beauty shop, Joyce tells her that a mysterious man stopped by, and asked that Joyce relay the message: "pleasant dreams." Joyce is subsequently stabbed to death in the salon by a man who resembles a disfigured Howard. Barry arrives at the salon moments later and claims to Irene that Howard also attacked him. Irene and Barry drive to Howard's estate, and Irene hears gunfire erupt when Barry enters the house. Irene rushes inside, and, in the wrecked laboratory, is confronted by what appears to be a disfigured Howard—however, he removes a prosthetic mask, revealing himself to in fact be Barry. Barry admits to having impersonated Howard, as well as for causing the explosion that killed him—he also tells Irene he made himself the primary beneficiary to Howard's will.

Barry attempts to kill Irene in laboratory, but is shot and wounded by "The Dream", who also appears. "The Dream" reveals himself to be George Fuller, the detective who had been following Irene, and awakening her at night. He informs her that Joyce was in fact his wife. Barry, though injured, proceeds to attack George, and the two men fall to their deaths through a gaping hole in the laboratory floor.

Cast

Production
Modestly budgeted, and shot entirely at Universal City, the film was a change of pace for Castle, who usually relied on gimmicks to sell his films, such as "Emergo" for House on Haunted Hill, or "Percepto" for The Tingler. This time, Castle relied on Bloch's reputation as the author of the novel on which Alfred Hitchcock's Psycho is based, as well as the re-teaming of Stanwyck and Taylor, who had been married from 1939 to 1951, as being sufficient to publicize the film.

Originally titled The Dream Killer, the role of Irene Trent was first offered to Joan Crawford (an old friend of Stanwyck) who declined as she was committed to appearing in Hush...Hush, Sweet Charlotte.

When asked if they had any objections to appearing in the film together, (Robert Taylor had remarried after his divorce from Barbara Stanwyck), Taylor replied "It's all right with me if it's all right with her," and Stanwyck said "Of course not—but you'd better ask Mr. and Mrs. Taylor." When asked if it was all right with her, Taylor's current wife Ursula Thiess said only "not necessarily."

Despite all of Castle's efforts, and mixed but generally favorable reviews, the film was not a financial success. It marked the end of Castle's most influential period as a director, although he would go on to produce and direct a number of additional films for Universal, and later, Paramount Pictures. Stanwyck continued working on television until 1986 with her final television series The Colbys.

Release
The Night Walker was released theatrically in Los Angeles on December 30, 1964. It opened the following month in New York City on January 20, 1965. The film continued to screen in the United States throughout July 1965. It marked star Stanwyck's final theatrical film role.

Marketing

Universal Pictures devised a sensationalistic advertising campaign for The Night Walker, with taglines reading: "Does sex dominate your dreams? Are you afraid of the things that can come out of your dreams... Lust... Murder... Secret desires?" The key artwork featured on the majority of the film's promotional materials, showing a sleeping woman observed by a demonic incubus, is based on Henry Fuseli's The Nightmare (1781). Castle hired hypnotist Pat Collins to help design a five-minute promotional short for the film's release, in which Collins questioned six people on the content of their nightmares. The short film cost approximately $25,000. To further promote the film, a novelization was published in December 1964 by Award Books, adapted from Bloch's screenplay by Sidney Stuart.

Beginning on January 4, 1965, stars Stanwyck, Taylor, and Bochner embarked on a national promotional tour for the film, which included dates in New York City, Boston, Philadelphia, Detroit, Chicago, and multiple cities in Texas.

Critical response
A review published by Time magazine deemed the film a "lukewarm bloodbath, but it does afford veteran horrorist Barbara Stanwyck a chance to release her hysteria as of yore"; it also commented on the unexpected casting of Stanwyck and Robert Taylor, who had been married and divorced years prior. Bosley Crowther of The New York Times praised Stanwyck's performance, writing that she "lends an air of dignity to the otherwise unbelievable woman in this totally unbelievable tale." Variety commented on the convoluted plot, noting that it "attains its goal as a chiller, but the unfolding is so complicated that [the] audience is frequently lost. [The] film carries sufficient suspense and elements of shock."

Margaret Harford of the Los Angeles Times praised the film's cinematography and use of locations, adding that the film "builds up some good suspense and moves on to a surprise ending that surprises because the spook-work has carefully prepared us for something else."

Home media
The film was released in 1993 on VHS.  It was later released on DVD by Universal Pictures and Turner Classic Movies as one of their "TCM Selects" titles on December 7, 2015, as part of a Double Feature with Dark Intruder from 1965. Shout! Factory released the film on Blu-ray on February 20, 2018, via their Scream Factory label. , the Blu-ray release had netted $81,839	in sales.

References

Sources

External links

 
 
 
 

1964 films
1964 horror films
1960s thriller films
American psychological horror films
American psychological thriller films
American black-and-white films
Films about blind people
Films about hairdressers
Films about inheritances
Films about nightmares
Films directed by William Castle
Films scored by Vic Mizzy
Films set in country houses
Films shot in Los Angeles
Films with screenplays by Robert Bloch
Mannequins in films
Universal Pictures films
1960s English-language films
1960s American films